Xyroptila dohertyi is a brown-colored moth of the family Pterophoridae which is endemic to western Thailand.

References

External links

Moths described in 2006
Endemic fauna of Thailand
Moths of Asia
dohertyi